Meatballs III: Summer Job is a 1987 Canadian comedy film and the third installment in the Meatballs film series. It is the first of the series to be rated R. Whereas Meatballs Part II was unconnected to the first movie, this film follows an adult Rudy Gerner, one of the main characters from Meatballs, now working a summer job for an angry boss named Mean Gene. Unlike the first two movies, this one is not set at summer camp, but rather at a nearby marina.

Plot
When porn star Roxy Doujor is denied entrance into the afterlife, she is given one last chance to help some poor soul on Earth. She finds Rudy Gerner working at a summer river resort.  Roxy is given the task of helping Rudy lose his virginity in order to be allowed into the afterlife.

Cast
 Patrick Dempsey as Rudy Gerner
 Sally Kellerman as Roxy Doujor
 George Buza as Gene "Mean Gene"
 Shannon Tweed as The Love Goddess
 Isabelle Mejias as Wendy
 Maury Chaykin as Huey, River Rat Leader
 Caroline Rhea as (uncredited) Beach Girl #4 (her debut role)

References

External links
MeatballsOnline The Meatballs Movie Website

1986 films
1980s sex comedy films
Canadian sequel films
Canadian sex comedy films
English-language Canadian films
Films about actors
Films about the afterlife
Films about pornography
Films about reincarnation
Films about virginity
1980s English-language films
Films scored by Paul Zaza
Films produced by Don Carmody
Beach party films
Films produced by John Dunning
Teen sex comedy films
1986 comedy films
Films directed by George Mendeluk
1980s Canadian films